Cooper Harold Langford (25 August 1895, Dublin, Logan County, Arkansas – 28 August 1964) was an American analytic philosopher and mathematical logician who co-authored the book Symbolic Logic (1932) with C. I. Lewis. He is also known for introducing the Langford–Moore paradox.

Biography
After spending his freshman year at the University of Arkansas, Langford transferred in 1915 to Clark University, where he received his A.B. degree in 1920. His college education was interrupted by World War I in 1917 when he joined the U.S. army and spent 20 months overseas. After receiving his A.B. degree, Langford enrolled in 1920 as a graduate student at Harvard University, where he earned his Ph.D. in psychology under Edwin Boring in 1924. With the aid of a Sheldon Traveling Fellowship, he studied logic and philosophy at Cambridge University during 1924–1925. Upon his return to the U.S., Langford became an instructor at Harvard from 1925 to 1927. After spending two academic years, 1927–1929, as an assistant professor at the University of Washington, he became in the autumn of 1929 an associate professor with tenure in the philosophy department at the University of Michigan. Langford became a full professor at U. Michigan in 1933, remaining there for the rest of his career. In the academic year 1935–1936, he was a Guggenheim fellow, dividing his time between Vienna and Cambridge, England.

Langford is famous as co-author of the 1932 book Symbolic Logic and the system of modal logic S5. His doctoral students include Arthur Burks.

In the philosophy of language,  Langford is known for the Langford substitution test. The test distinguishes used from merely mentioned expressions in a given sentence by translating the sentence into a different language (see Langford 1937). If the very same expression reoccurs in the translation, it was mentioned rather than used in the original sentence. If the expression does not reoccur and is replaced by some other (usually synonymous) expression, then it was used in the original sentence. This test is used by a famous argument from Alonzo Church concerning Carnap's treatment of belief attributions and other analyses of beliefs as relations to sentences  (see Church 1950).

Langford was married twice. His son Cooper H. Langford was a chemist.

Selected works

Notes

References

External links 
Works by C. H. Langford – PhilPapers

Clark University alumni
20th-century American philosophers
American logicians
American philosophy academics
Analytic philosophers
Harvard University alumni
University of Michigan faculty
1895 births
1964 deaths